Jesper Meinby Pedersen (born April 24, 1987) is a Danish handball player. He plays for AEK Athens.

During his youth career, Meinby played several matches for the Danish national youth handball teams.

References

 Player info at VHK.dk

Danish male handball players
Viborg HK players
1987 births
Living people